Jorge Rodríguez (born 18 April 1948) is a Cuban gymnast. He competed at the 1968 Summer Olympics and the 1972 Summer Olympics.

References

1948 births
Living people
Cuban male artistic gymnasts
Olympic gymnasts of Cuba
Gymnasts at the 1968 Summer Olympics
Gymnasts at the 1972 Summer Olympics
Sportspeople from Havana
Pan American Games medalists in gymnastics
Pan American Games gold medalists for Cuba
Pan American Games silver medalists for Cuba
Pan American Games bronze medalists for Cuba
Gymnasts at the 1967 Pan American Games
Gymnasts at the 1971 Pan American Games
Medalists at the 1967 Pan American Games
20th-century Cuban people
21st-century Cuban people